Kyle Thomas (born 23 June 1983) is a Canadian screenwriter, director, producer, and actor. His first feature film, The Valley Below, premiered at the Toronto International Film Festival in 2014. It garnered two Canadian Screen Award nominations in the categories of Best Supporting Actor for Kris Demeanor and Best Original Song for Dan Mangan's "Wants".  The film received largely positive reviews from the Canadian media, including The Globe and Mail and the National Post, who called the film a "superb first feature".

Early life and education
Thomas was born in Vancouver, British Columbia, and raised in Calgary, Alberta. He began making films with the Calgary Society of Independent Filmmakers in his teenage years before attending Concordia University's Mel Hoppenheim School of Cinema in Montreal in the early 2000s. After completing his BFA, he returned to Calgary to establish the North Country Cinema media arts collective in 2005.

Career

Directing and producing

Thomas is a founding member of North Country Cinema, along with filmmakers Alexander Carson and Nicholas Martin, whom he met at the Mel Hoppenheim School of Cinema at Concordia University in Montreal, Quebec. Through North Country Cinema, Thomas has focused on producing director-driven film and video content, and has created award-winning works that have screened at major international festivals, including the Toronto International Film Festival and SXSW. Thomas' recent films have portrayed neo-realist narratives concerned with intimate, personal stories depicting life in rural Alberta. Following the announcement that his first feature film The Valley Below would be funded by Telefilm Canada, he was declared one of "10 Canadians to Watch at Cannes" in 2013.

Acting work
Thomas plays the role of Danny in North Country Cinema's second feature film O, Brazen Age written and directed by Alexander Carson. The film premiered at the Vancouver International Film Festival in 2015.

Filmography
 2007: Last Chance Saloon
 2008: Ghost Town
 2009: Liminal State of Decay
 2011: Not Far from the Abattoir
 2012: The Post
 2014: The Valley Below
 2021: Range Roads

References

External links
 
 North Country Cinema official website

1983 births
Living people
21st-century Canadian male actors
Concordia University alumni
Male actors from Calgary
Male actors from Vancouver
Canadian male screenwriters
Film producers from Alberta
Film producers from British Columbia
Film directors from Calgary
Film directors from Vancouver
Writers from Calgary
Writers from Vancouver